The Mercer Bears men's basketball team represents Mercer University in Macon, Georgia, United States. The school's team competes in the Southern Conference. They are led by head coach Greg Gary  and play their home games at Hawkins Arena.

History
Mercer has competed in the NCAA tournament three times, including 1981 and 1985; the team lost in the first round in both years. The Bears won the 2012 CollegeInsider.com Postseason Tournament, defeating Utah State in the championship game; the victory was the first postseason championship won by a team from the Atlantic Sun Conference.

Mercer's biggest win occurred at the 2014 NCAA Division I men's basketball tournament, where they beat third-seed Duke in the second round.

Postseason

NCAA Division I tournament results
The Bears have appeared in three NCAA Division I Tournaments. Their combined record is 1–3. Their latest appearance was the 2014 NCAA Tournament.

NCAA Division II tournament results
The Bears have appeared in one NCAA Division II tournament. Their record is 0–2.

NIT results
The Bears have appeared in one National Invitation Tournament (NIT). Their record is 1–1.

CBI results
The Bears have appeared in the College Basketball Invitational (CBI) two times. Their combined record is 2–2.

CIT results
The Bears have appeared in the CollegeInsider.com Postseason Tournament (CIT) two times. They are 5–1 and were champions in 2012.

NAIA Tournament results
The Bears have appeared in two NAIA Tournaments. Their combined record is 0–2.

NIBT results
The Bears participated in the 1922 National Intercollegiate Basketball Tournament, the first national championship tournament ever held in intercollegiate basketball. Their record is 0–1.

Players

Retired numbers
Mercer has retired six numbers in program history.

References

External links